Giles Fletcher, the Elder (c. 1548 – 1611) was an English poet and diplomat, member of the English Parliament.

Giles Fletcher was the son of Richard Fletcher, vicar of Bishop's Stortford.

Fletcher was born in Watford, Hertfordshire.  He spent his early life at Cranbrook before entering Eton College in about 1561. From there, Fletcher continued his education at King's College, Cambridge, where he was appointed a fellow in 1568 and gained his B.A. in the academic year 1569-70.

Studying Greek and poetry, Fletcher contributed to the translation of several of Demosthenes' orations. On 22 March 1572, Fletcher became a lecturer in King's and held this position until March the following year, until he became a lecturer in Greek, a position which he held until Michaelmas term 1579. Continually rising within the academia, Fletcher rose to dean of arts, the highest position he was to attain at Kings, in 1580-81. However, this would not last long, for he decided to marry, forcing him to give up his fellowship. On 16 January, in his father's church, he married Joan Sheafe. Returning to Cambridge later, he received his Doctor of Civil Law degree. After attaining his law degree, the family settled back in Cranbrook, where once again the family was united. On 8 April 1582, Giles and Joan's first child, Phineas, was baptized. During the same year, Giles was made chancellor of the diocese of Sussex.

In 1584, Fletcher was elected to the parliament which began on 23 November, for Winchelsea, one of the Cinque Ports. It was at this point that the Fletchers would permanently call London home. During his stint in Parliament, Fletcher served on three committees. In 1586, Fletcher was appointed as the Remembrancer of the City of London, an office which he held until 1605. In 1588 he was an ambassador to Russia to reestablish the treaty with tsar Feodor I of Russia. Fletcher published a treatise, Of the Russe Common Wealth (1591). The treaty to be reestablished was primarily concerning the English trade, but before he departed Queen Elizabeth made him a Master of Requests. Fletcher's account gives a vivid description of the Russian world pre-1600.

He is best known for his sonnet Licia. He is the father of the poet Giles Fletcher, the Younger.

References

External links
 
 
 

1540s births
1611 deaths
People from Watford
17th-century English male writers
17th-century English writers
16th-century English poets
17th-century English poets
English MPs 1584–1585
Writers about Russia
Fellows of King's College, Cambridge
Alumni of King's College, Cambridge
Ambassadors of England to Russia
16th-century English diplomats
People educated at Eton College
English male poets